The Agreement on Disengagement is an agreement between Israel and Syria that was signed on May 31, 1974, which officially ended the Yom Kippur War and the subsequent attrition period on the Syrian front.

Background
As soon as the ceasefire came into place at the end of the Yom Kippur War, a time when Israel had control over the entire territory of the Golan Heights, including the area Syria had controlled before the war and which Israel had conquered during the war. The area consisted of many small Syrian villages as well as volcanic cone and the top of Hermon mountain.

Even though the temporary ceasefire was made official, both sides kept exchanging fire, bringing the situation into attrition. It continued throughout the negotiation process, and became more intense every time it was interrupted. Negotiations were repeatedly initiated by the United Nations Security Council Resolution 339, however from its very beginning there were multiple disputes over its procedures that prevented the resolution from being successful. The attrition grew even more as the Agreement on Disengagement between Israel and Egypt was finally signed in January 1974.

Israel demanded that a list of its captives held in Syria be released as a condition for re-opening the negotiations, and asked that they be allowed to receive medical treatment from the Red Cross if needed. Syria denied the request, demanding territorial compensation in exchange. U.S. Secretary of State Henry Kissinger, came for a short shuttling journey between Jerusalem and Damascus in February 1974 (he later admitted in his books that he had decided to mediate due to pressure from the Egyptian President Anwar Sadat and ruler of Saudi Arabia, who had deep interests in finishing the Yom Kippur War and the oil crisis that was going on). On February 27, Kissinger returned from Damascus with a list of prisoners, following a promise given to the Syrians that Quneitra will be given back to them, and then began formal negotiations.

Attrition warfare greatly increased in the coming months, and between March and May there were over a thousand different incidents, including heavy bombings on cities in the Golan as well as constant fire at Israel Defense Forces (IDF) forces, and battles over the control of Mount Hermon. Throughout this period, fears that the battles will become a full-scale war delayed the release of reserve units in months. Syrians demanded Israeli withdrawal from large territories in the Golan which they had lost.

In exchange, a 235 square kilometer (146 sq mi) UNDOF buffer zone was formed on the Syrian side of that line. According to testimonies of the participants in the negotiations, there were bargainings about the smallest detail until the agreement was signed in Geneva on May 31, 1974 (more than seven months after the ceasefire declaration). The negotiations led to many misunderstandings and indirectly caused the crises of fire incidents, such as when Israel agreed to give back Syria the control over Quneitra, Syria interpreted it as if the area referred to included the Avital and Bental mountains, while Israel intended only to the area of the city itself. The negotiations went on with continued U.S. pressure on Israel.

Details and implementation
It was decided in the agreement that the two countries will maintain the ceasefire and immediately return prisoners of war on both sides. Then, it said, Israel will withdraw from all the enclaved areas and the Hermon top it occupied during the war, and a surface of about 25 km2 around the city of Quneitra and other small areas occupied during the Six-Day War. Finally, two separation lines were put into place: Israeli (marked in blue) and Syrian (marked in red), including a 235 km2 UNDOF buffer zone on the Syrian side.

The agreement stated that the Syrian civilians forced to leave their homes in the buffer zone will be able to return to them, as it pledged fight terrorist activities in the Golan Heights. These two undertakings were given as an oral commitment to the United States. Following the agreement was the establishment of the United Nations Disengagement Observer Force Zone (UNDOF), which appointed 1,043 soldiers to oversee the buffer zone.

Prisoners were returned immediately after the signing of the agreement (June 1–6, 1974), and Israel withdrew from Mount Hermon and the enclave areas. The new separation line was completed on June 26, 1974. Unlike what many had expected, the agreement on disengagement between Israel and Syria not only lasted for more than 45 years, but has been in place from the moment it was signed until today. This makes it the longest successful agreement Israel has ever had with an Arab country.

See also
 1949 Armistice Agreements

References

External links
 Israel and Syria Agreement on Disengagement at JSTOR
 Keesing's Worldwide LLC, The Arab-Israel Conflict -Disengagement of Forces - Agreement between Syria and Israel, Volume 20, June, 1974
 

Golan Heights
Israel–Syria relations
Treaties concluded in 1974
Treaties entered into force in 1974
1974 in Israel
1974 in Syria
Treaties of Israel
Treaties of Syria